The Yamaha XT660 is dual-purpose on/off road motorcycles released by Yamaha Motors as a replacement for the XT600.

It is a development of the original XT series ('X' stands for 4 strokes, 'T' for TRAIL), a line of motorcycles inspired by those used on the Paris Dakar rally. The first XT was released in 1976. The XT660R is the standard Enduro model ('R' stands for racing).

A five-valve version of the 660 cc engine was used in a number of MZ (MuZ) motorcycles, including the MZ Skorpion, Baghira and Mastiff.

After 2015 this bike was not sold in some European countries and US.

Related Models

Two other versions of this motorcycle are being produced alongside the XT660R – the XT660X, a more street-oriented supermoto version, and the XT660Z Ténéré, an adventure touring version,. All versions utilize the same engine and share some chassis components.

External links

 Yamaha Europe XT660R Official site.

XT660R
Dual-sport motorcycles
Motorcycles introduced in 1976